Daniel L. Haynes (June 6, 1889 – July 28, 1954) was an American stage and film actor and clergyman. He is best known for starring as Zeke in the early all-black King Vidor directed film Halleljuah. On November 28, 1910, he married Rosa Belle Sims in Chicago. In his last years, he left show business and became a full-time Baptist minister. At the time of M-G-M's Hallelujah, Haynes is quoted as having said: "I cannot say what our race owes King Vidor and Metro-Goldwyn-Mayer --- there are not words forceful enough for that. Hallelujah will, as Moses led his people from the wilderness, lead ours from the wilderness of misunderstanding and apathy."

Selected filmography 

 John Smith (1922)
 Hallelujah (1929)
 The Last Mile (1932)
 Mary Burns, Fugitive (1935)
 So Red the Rose (1935)
 Escape from Devil's Island (1935)
 Fury (1936)

Theater
 Rang Tang (1927)

References

External links

Daniel L. Haynes at KinoTV

1889 births
1954 deaths
African-American male actors
Male actors from Atlanta
Year of birth uncertain
20th-century American male actors
American male film actors
20th-century African-American people